The Passion of Ayn Rand is a 1999 American biographical drama television film directed by Christopher Menaul and written by Howard Korder and Mary Gallagher, based on the 1986 book of the same name by Barbara Branden.

The film stars Helen Mirren as philosopher and novelist Ayn Rand, who engages in an affair with Nathaniel Branden, played by Eric Stoltz, a psychologist who is 25 years younger than she is. Branden built up an institute to spread Rand's ideas, but the two eventually had a falling-out. The film also stars Julie Delpy as Branden's wife Barbara and Peter Fonda as Rand's husband Frank O'Connor.

The Passion of Ayn Rand premiered at the Sundance Film Festival on January 27, 1999, and aired on Showtime on May 30, 1999. It received moderately positive reviews from critics.

Cast
 Helen Mirren as Ayn Rand
 Eric Stoltz as Nathaniel Branden
 Julie Delpy as Barbara Branden
 Peter Fonda as Frank O'Connor
 Tom McCamus as Richard

Production
Filming took place in Toronto.

Release
The film premiered at the Sundance Film Festival on January 27, 1999. It aired on Showtime on May 30, 1999.

Reception

Critical reception
Based on reviews collected by Rotten Tomatoes, the film has an overall approval rating from critics of 80%, with an average score of 6.8/10. Writing in Variety, David Kronke called the film "an ambitious, visually sumptuous attempt to depict a bizarre element of a controversial personality's life". Kronke went on to say, "Unfortunately, its insistence on maintaining a detached point of view towards its characters – or, rather, no point of view at all, as the filmmakers seem reticent to offend either Rand fans or detractors – renders it dramatically inert."

Awards and nominations

References

External links 

 
 
 
 

1999 films
1999 drama films
1999 independent films
1990s American films
1990s biographical drama films
1990s English-language films
American biographical drama films
American drama television films
Biographical films about philosophers
Biographical films about writers
Biographical television films
Cultural depictions of Ayn Rand
Films based on biographies
Films directed by Christopher Menaul
Films scored by Jeff Beal
Films set in 1951
Films set in 1957
Films set in 1964
Films set in 1981
Films set in 1982
Films set in Los Angeles
Films set in New York City
Films shot in Toronto
Showtime (TV network) films
Television films based on books
Works about Ayn Rand